Moskovia Airlines was an airline based in Zhukovsky, Moscow, Russia. It operated domestic and international passenger and cargo charters. Its main base was Domodedovo Airport.

History

Development

In its beginnings the carrier operated cargo flights only; regular scheduled passenger services commenced in 2000. The airline was renamed Moskovia Airlines in 2006. Russian-manufactured aircraft (An-12s, An-24s, Tu-134s, Tu-154s and Yak-40s) made up the fleet until 2009, when leased Boeing 737s were phased in. The Sukhoi Superjet 100 was incorporated into the fleet in 2013.

Grounding
Moskovia Airlines filed for bankruptcy in February 2014 but planned to continue its operations. Delays with flights returning passengers from the Montenegrin resort of Tivat and also with services from Astrakhan to Turkey were revealed in mid-; at this time, it was informed the airline was unable to pay for the fuel. An inspection that came after these delays resulted in the Russia's Federal Air Transport Agency Rosaviatsia suspending the commercialisation of tickets and the airline shrinking its operations to serve just the Moscow–Tivat route. That month, it was reported that the company would apparently continue its operations as a charter airline.

In , Rosaviatsia suspended the Moskovias's air operator's certificate (AOC) following the carrier's CEO stating the carrier could no longer operate due to financial difficulties. One of the causes for the suspension of the AOC responded to the fact that Moskovia did not meet the Russian regulations for the minimum number of aircraft to operate scheduled passenger services.

Destinations 
This is a list of destinations served by Moscovia Airlines (as of December 2013):

Asia

 Yerevan – Zvartnots International Airport

 Ganja – Ganja International Airport

 Antalya – Antalya Airport

 Bukhara – Bukhara International Airport
 Fergana – Fergana Airport
 Karshi – Karshi Airport
 Namangan – Namangan Airport
 Navoiy – Navoi International Airport
 Samarkand – Samarkand International Airport

Europe

 Sarajevo – Sarajevo International Airport

 Prague – Prague Václav Havel Airport

 Berlin – Berlin-Tegel Airport
 Munich – Munich International Airport

 Tivat – Tivat Airport

 Belgorod - Belgorod Airport
 Moscow - Domodedovo Airport Base
 Stavropol - Shpakovskoye Airport

Fleet 

The Moskovia Airlines fleet includes the following (as of January 2014):

The airline also used to operate three Boeing 737-800, but they were returned to lessors in March, 2011.

Incidents and accidents 
 On 26 May 2008, a Moscovia Airlines An-12 cargo aircraft crashed near Chelyabinsk, Russia, killing all nine crew members.

See also

 Transport in Russia

References

External links 

  Moskovia Airlines official website

Defunct airlines of Russia
Companies based in Moscow
Airlines established in 1995
Defunct cargo airlines
Airlines disestablished in 2014
1995 establishments in Russia
2014 disestablishments in Russia
Cargo airlines of Russia